"How to Be a Heartbreaker" is a song by Welsh singer Marina Diamandis, released under the stage name Marina and the Diamonds, from her second studio album, Electra Heart (2012). It was released on 7 December 2012 by 679 Artists and Atlantic Records as the album's third and final single. Diamandis worked with Ammar Malik, Benny Blanco, Cirkut, Daniel Omelio, and Dr. Luke during the songwriting process, and enlisted Blanco, Cirkut, and Dr. Luke to oversee its production.

Background and release
Diamandis explained that "How to Be a Heartbreaker" was the only new track on the US edition of her album Electra Heart, and she wrote it "as the UK album was being printed." Lyrically, she stated the song "basically involves four rules on how to be a heartbreaker. It's a guide for everyone!" Despite initially confirming to Digital Spy that "How to Be a Heartbreaker" would be released in the United Kingdom on 15 October 2012, Diamandis ultimately stated via her Twitter page on 22 November 2012 that the UK release of the song would be postponed until spring 2013 because of her US tour in December.

Music video
On 19 September 2012, Diamandis announced on her Twitter page that the music video for "How to Be a Heartbreaker" would premiere online on 24 September. However, problems occurred on the day of the supposed release, and Diamandis took to her Twitter to explain the situation: "So, someone at my record label won't let me release the video because I look ugly in it apparently and we need more money and time to paint out ugly parts. The video will be out end of the week. If not, I am happy to leak the 'minger' version for my fans." The video premiered on 28 September 2012 on YouTube. Marina also worked on the song for about 6 months prior to being released.

The video was directed by duo Marc & Ish and filmed in late August 2012. It opens with Diamandis in a shower surrounded by Speedo-clad male models. It includes various close-up shots of Diamandis and the models throughout the video. She also appears with four different men in various settings, each showing her with a different colored hair ribbon. It includes shots of her walking alone on the beach in some parts of the video, and includes a shot of her holding a platter with a severed and bloodied mannequin head. She dons black hair and various black dresses throughout the video, and her signature heart makeup on her cheek.

Commercial performance
"How to Be a Heartbreaker" was released as the third single off Electra Heart. The song was a commercial success worldwide. In the United Kingdom the song peaked at number 88 and spent one week on the chart. The song ranks as Marina's fifth best-selling track to date in the United Kingdom, with 95,000 combined sales as of February 2019. "How to Be a Heartbreaker" was certified Silver in the United Kingdom in November 2021, denoting sales in excess of 200,000 units. In Denmark the song peaked at number 18 and was certified Platinum. The single was certified Platinum by the Recording Industry Association of America (RIAA) in June 2021.

Live performances
Diamandis first performed "How to Be a Heartbreaker" live on 29 June 2012 on The Lonely Hearts Club Tour at the HMV Institute in Birmingham. She has since performed the song during most of her Lonely Hearts Club Tour performances and opening performances on Coldplay's Mylo Xyloto Tour, occasionally adding another breakdown after the second chorus. On 9 July 2012, she performed the song on Jimmy Kimmel Live! along with "Primadonna". She has performed the song acoustically on various radio stations and television appearances in Europe and Canada. She also performed the song as part of her "YouTube Presents" streaming performance along with four other songs from Electra Heart on 15 August 2012. Diamandis performed "How to Be a Heartbreaker" live on the season finale of Denmark's X Factor on 22 March 2013, along with "Primadonna".

Other versions
The song was covered by Dean Geyer and Lea Michele on the Glee episode "Feud".

Track listings
UK and Irish digital download (EP)
"How to Be a Heartbreaker" – 3:41
"How to Be a Heartbreaker" (Kat Krazy remix) – 3:34
"How to Be a Heartbreaker" (Almighty remix) – 5:37
"How to Be a Heartbreaker" (Kitty Pryde remix) – 3:00
"How to Be a Heartbreaker" (Baunz remix) – 7:27

Canadian and US digital download (remixes)
"How to Be a Heartbreaker" (Dada Life remix) – 6:28
"How to Be a Heartbreaker" (Dada Life remix radio edit) – 3:16

Charts

Certifications

Release history

References

2012 singles
2012 songs
679 Artists singles
Atlantic Records singles
Marina Diamandis songs
Song recordings produced by Benny Blanco
Song recordings produced by Cirkut (record producer)
Song recordings produced by Dr. Luke
Songs written by Ammar Malik
Songs written by Dr. Luke
Songs written by Robopop
Songs written by Marina Diamandis